Maria-Frances Serrant (born 14 November 2002) is a Trinidadian footballer who plays as a midfielder for US college team Corban Warriors and the Trinidad and Tobago women's national team.

Early life
Serrant was raised in Port of Spain.

High school and college career
Serrant has attended the Diego Martin Central Secondary School in Diego Martin, Trinidad. Since 2020, she attends the Corban University in Salem, Oregon, United States.

International career
Serrant represented Trinidad and Tobago at the 2016 CONCACAF Girls' U-15 Championship and the 2020 CONCACAF Women's U-20 Championship. At senior level, she played the 2020 CONCACAF Women's Olympic Qualifying Championship qualification.

International goals
Scores and results list Trinidad and Tobago goal tally first

References

External links

2002 births
Living people
Sportspeople from Port of Spain
Trinidad and Tobago women's footballers
Women's association football midfielders

Corban University alumni
College women's soccer players in the United States
Trinidad and Tobago women's futsal players
Futsal players at the 2018 Summer Youth Olympics
Trinidad and Tobago women's international footballers
Trinidad and Tobago expatriate women's footballers
Trinidad and Tobago expatriate sportspeople in the United States
Expatriate women's soccer players in the United States